Liu Wei-ting (born 6 January 1995) is a Taiwanese taekwondo athlete, born in Changhua County.

He represented Taipei at the 2016 Summer Olympics in Rio de Janeiro, in the men's 80 kg. He won a bronze medal at the 2014 Asian Taekwondo Championships, and a silver medal at the 2016 Asian Taekwondo Championships.

References

External links

1995 births
Living people
Taiwanese male taekwondo practitioners
Olympic taekwondo practitioners of Taiwan
Taekwondo practitioners at the 2016 Summer Olympics
Taekwondo practitioners at the 2014 Asian Games
Universiade medalists in taekwondo
Taekwondo practitioners at the 2018 Asian Games
Universiade bronze medalists for Chinese Taipei
Asian Games competitors for Chinese Taipei
Medalists at the 2019 Summer Universiade
Asian Taekwondo Championships medalists
Medalists at the 2015 Summer Universiade
Medalists at the 2017 Summer Universiade
Taekwondo practitioners at the 2020 Summer Olympics
21st-century Taiwanese people